Alexander Hvaal (born 25 May 1992) is a professional rallycross driver from Larvik in Vestfold, Norway. He has raced in the European Rallycross Championship since 2012 and the World Rallycross Championship since its inception in 2014.

Results

Complete FIA European Rallycross Championship results

Division 1A

Supercar

Complete FIA World Rallycross Championship results

Supercar

External links

 Alexander Hvaal on Facebook

1992 births
Living people
People from Larvik
Norwegian racing drivers
European Rallycross Championship drivers
World Rallycross Championship drivers
Sportspeople from Vestfold og Telemark